Al Kadhimiya is a sports club that is based in the Al Kadhimiya district in Iraq. Its football team currently plays in the Iraq Division One, the second tier of Iraqi football. Al-Kadhimiya participated in the Iraqi Premier League on six previous occasions.

The club was founded in 1952.

Honours
Love and Peace Cup
Winners (1): 2013

References

Football clubs in Iraq
Football clubs in Baghdad